Hillsgrove is an unincorporated community in Sullivan County, Pennsylvania, United States. Hillsgrove has a post office with ZIP code 18619.

References

Unincorporated communities in Sullivan County, Pennsylvania
Unincorporated communities in Pennsylvania